Fissicrambus fissiradiellus is a moth in the family Crambidae. It was described by Francis Walker in 1863.

Habitat
It is found in Puerto Rico, Jamaica, the Dominican Republic and North America, where it is Florida, Texas and Virginia.

References

Crambini
Moths described in 1863
Moths of North America